The 1979 Baltimore mayoral election saw the reelection of William Donald Schaefer to a third consecutive term.

Nominations
Primary elections were held September 11.

Democratic primary

Republican primary

General election
The general election was held November 6.

References

Baltimore mayoral
Mayoral elections in Baltimore
Baltimore